Locomotive No. 44 of the Brunswick State Railway Company (Braunschweigische Landes-Eisenbahn-Gesellschaft, BLE) was a tank locomotive for mixed passenger and goods traffic. The locomotive, built in 1934 by Krupp, had a 2-8-2T wheel arrangement and a two-cylinder superheated engine. Leading and trailing wheels were housed in a Bissel bogie. Rather unusual for such a locomotive were the smoke deflectors which were attached directly to the side tanks and extended as far as the front buffer beam.

After the takeover of the BLE by the Deutsche Reichsbahn in 1938, the engine was given the running number 79 001, re-using a number previously given to a Saxon XV HTV that had been retired in 1933.

It was retired there in 1973.

The running number 79 001 was allocated in 1951 to the former French locomotive, 1-242.TA.602, which had ended up in German hands after the war.

References 

 
 Weisbrod, Bäzold, Obermayer: Das große Typenbuch deutscher Dampflokomotiven. Transpress Verlag

See also
List of DRG locomotives and railbuses

2-8-2T locomotives
Private locomotives of Germany
Steam locomotives of Germany
Krupp locomotives
Railway locomotives introduced in 1934
Individual locomotives of Germany